Samantha Dodd (born 13 August 1979) is a South African retired track and field athlete who competed in the pole vault. Dodd was the pole vault champion at the 2003 All-Africa Games, and finished second in the pole vault and high jump at the 2004 African Championships.

Statistics

Personal bests

International competitions

National titles
South African Athletics Championships
Pole vault: 2003, 2004, 2006

References

External links

1979 births
Living people
South African female pole vaulters
Athletes (track and field) at the 2003 All-Africa Games
African Games gold medalists for South Africa
African Games medalists in athletics (track and field)
South African Athletics Championships winners